S700 may refer to :

 Fujifilm FinePix S700, a camera
 S700, a Nikon Coolpix series camera
 Sony Cyber-shot DSC-S700, a camera
 S700, a Sony Ericsson mobile phone 
 S700, a Sony Walkman S Series digital audio player
 S700, several Yamaha Corporation products
 SIAI-Marchetti S.700 Cormorano, an Italian amphibian aircraft proposal 
 Siemens S700 and S70 light rail vehicle

See also